The Savage is a 1952 American Technicolor Western film directed by George Marshall. The film stars Charlton Heston, Susan Morrow, and Peter Hansen. Much of The Savage was shot in the Black Hills of South Dakota. The film is based on L. L. Foreman's novel, The Renegade, first published in 1949 by Pocket Books.

Plot
A young boy, Jim Aherne Jr., is the only survivor of a raid on a wagon train by Crow Indians. He is rescued by a group of Sioux Indians and is raised by Chief Yellow Eagle as a Sioux and renamed War Bonnet. Jim grows to maturity, but soon his loyalties between his tribe and his white heritage are questioned. Gold is discovered in the Black Hills and the Sioux expect the sovereignty of their territory to be respected because of an earlier treaty.

War Bonnet is sent to Fort Duane to determine whether the U.S. government intend to honor the treaty. On his way, he helps save a party of U.S. cavalry, led by Lt. Hathersall, from an attack by Crow Indians. He then introduces himself as Jim Aherne and tells them he is taking some ponies to the fort to sell, insinuating that he is merely a local trapper. Because of his actions, he is received warmly by Col. Robert Ellis at the fort. The Colonel has Lt. Hathersall take care of Jim while he is their guest and Hathersall's sister, Tally, takes an instant liking to him, seeing him as rugged, mysterious, and handsome. Capt. Vaughant has his eye on Tally and doesn't agree with Jim having dinner with them. She asks him to leave and on his way out he calls Jim a savage, inciting Jim to attack him briefly. After several days, War Bonnet is leaving the fort to go on a picnic with the Hathersall siblings when he sees smoke signals in the distance. Not disclosing their meaning to them, he leaves and discovers dead soldiers in the hills. Out of the woods comes his friend from the tribe, Long Mane, who tells him that the soldiers were killed by a party of Crow and that Jim's sister, Luta, was taken captive. She had been with the soldiers as she was traveling to the fort to find Jim. War Bonnet leads a party of Sioux on a raid on the Crow camp and rescues his sister. On the ride back, they encounter Capt. Vaughant and some soldiers who have discovered the soldiers that were killed by the Crow. During the brief encounter, Luta is killed as the troops attack them without provocation.

Taking her body back to his tribe, War Bonnet is now convinced that the whites will not honor the treaty and agrees to go back and lead the soldiers at Fort Duane into an ambush. Meanwhile, Col. Ellis has received orders from Washington that all the Indians are to be moved to reservations, by force if necessary. Returning to the fort as a scout, War Bonnet leads Vaughant's men to a Crow camp instead of the Sioux. They send artillery into the camp, scattering the Crow into the hills. Using explosives, War Bonnet and Corp. Martin flush the fleeing Crow out of the forest where they are subdued by Lt. Hathersall and his men. After the battle, Vaughant, wounded and furious at the outcome, tries to shoot War Bonnet. Corp. Martin intervenes and Vaughant is killed. Later that night, War Bonnet leaves camp and meets with Yellow Eagle and finds they have planned to attack the remaining column the next day. When Yellow Eagle orders no prisoners to be taken, War Bonnet questions the wisdom of the attack. He goes along with the plan but his internal struggle continues after a wagon train of women and children have joined the column for protection.

As they approach the ambush site, struggling with memories of his own youth and family that were killed, War Bonnet helps the wagon train escape the planned ambush but is injured by an arrow. Taken back to the fort, a doctor tends to his wound. Tally and Corp. Martin, who has taken a liking to Jim as well, question how he knew the ambush was going to happen. That same night, Jim sneaks out of the fort and, still weak from his wound, meets with Yellow Eagle to try to persuade him to abandon his war plans. Surrounded by those who now hate him, he pleads for them to not fight so they won't be decimated and forgotten to history due to the white man's numbers and war superiority. Reluctantly, but according to Sioux law for betraying him, Yellow Eagle throws a spear at him, injuring him but leaving him alive. Yellow Eagle then declares the matter over and says for his people to return to their fires. War Bonnet's mother, Pehangi, then argues in support of War Bonnet's pleas while tending to his wound, convincing Yellow Eagle that his son is right. War Bonnet is then taken back to the fort and left outside its walls where Corp. Martin and other soldiers ride out to meet him. As the Sioux go away, War Bonnet tells Corp. Martin that they aren't going away but merely making some elbow room for others, using Corp. Martin's line from earlier and implying that the war has been averted.

Cast
 Charlton Heston - Jim Aherne, Jr./War Bonnet
 Susan Morrow - Tally Hathersall
 Peter Hansen - Lt. Weston Hathersall
 Joan Taylor - Luta
 Richard Rober - Capt. Arnold Vaughant
 Don Porter - Running Dog
 Ted de Corsia - Iron Breast
 Ian MacDonald - Chief Yellow Eagle
 Milburn Stone - Corp. Martin
 Angela Clarke - Pehangi
 Michael Tolan - Long Mane
 Howard Negley - Col. Robert Ellis
 Orly Lindgren - Jim Aherne, Jr. (as a boy)

Reception

Critical response
The staff writers at Variety wrote in their review: "This tale of Indian fighting travels in fairly devious circles to relate a standard story [from a novel by L.L. Foreman]. However, it has excellent outdoor photography and liberal amounts of Indian fighting scenes. Charlton Heston has a fairly confused role which forces the story to travel unnecessarily in circles. [...] The femme interest is slight, with Susan Morrow as the belle of the army fort. Joan Taylor as an Indian maid is Morrow’s major competition for Heston’s affection. Peter Hansen and Richard Rober do well in major white roles while Indians are staunchly portrayed by Ian MacDonald and Donald Porter."

Release
The Savage was released in theatres on September 1, 1952. The film was released on DVD by Paramount Home Media Distribution. The Savage was released on DVD by Paramount Home Media Distribution in Europe (region 2).

References

External links
 
 

1952 films
1952 Western (genre) films
American Western (genre) films
American Indian Wars films
Western (genre) cavalry films
Films set in South Dakota
Films shot in South Dakota
Films scored by Paul Sawtell
Paramount Pictures films
1950s English-language films
1950s American films